The QClash is the name given to the Australian rules football rivalry match between the  Brisbane Lions and Gold Coast Suns, who both participate in the Australian Football League (AFL). The first QClash was held in 2011, with Gold Coast winning by 8 points. The game established the highest pay TV audience ever for an AFL game, with a total of 354,745 viewers watching the game.

Background
The QClash was promoted by the league, the clubs and the football media as a name for the game, in similar terms to the other local derbies that exist in the AFL, such as the Western Derby and Showdown.

The medal for the player adjudged best on ground in the QClash is awarded the Marcus Ashcroft Medal. It is named after former footballer Marcus Ashcroft, who played junior football on the Gold Coast for Surfers Paradise/Southport and 318 VFL/AFL games for the Brisbane Bears/Lions between 1989 and 2003. He was the first Queenslander to play 300 VFL/AFL games and later served as a coach and administrator for the Gold Coast Suns. Former Brisbane captain Dayne Beams and current Gold Coast captain Touk Miller have won the medal a record three times.

The trophy awarded to the winner of the game is currently known as the "QClash Trophy". The trophy is a "traditional style" looking silver cup with a wooden base and a plaque. The plaque's inscription reads from left to right, "Brisbane Lions AFC", "QCLASH", "Gold Coast Suns FC".

Venues

Notable QClashes

QClash 1 — Inaugural Queensland Clash
The first edition of the QClash took place on 7 May 2011 at the Gabba. The Suns were required to host the inaugural meeting between the two teams at the Gabba as their home ground, Carrara Stadium, was unavailable until later that year. Despite the Lions not having won a game for the season leading into the game, they were considered strong favourites to defeat their Gold Coast neighbours. The Suns had recorded their first ever AFL win two weeks prior to the clash while Brisbane was winless leading into the first ever Queensland derby. In the lead up to the match, triple premiership Lion Simon Black expressed resentment towards the Suns by stating "the AFL have given them everything, and then some" as well as labelling former Brisbane players Jared Brennan and Michael Rischitelli "mercenaries" because they had joined the Suns in the off season. Gold Coast coach Guy McKenna returned serve by stating that the Suns were brought into the competition to clean up the mess left by the Brisbane Bears, which Lions coach and former Bears player Michael Voss said he took personally and stated that McKenna's comments were "out of line". Two days before the game it was revealed that 10 Queenslanders had been chosen to compete in the clash. The Suns got off to a hot start in the first quarter and led the clash by 19 points at first exchange of ends. The Gold Coast held that lead through the first three quarters and the tension rose early in the third term when Gold Coast's David Swallow unintentionally knocked Brisbane's Andrew Raines unconscious, who was taken off with concussion. Trailing by 19 points at the beginning of the fourth quarter, the Lions mounted a comeback off the back of six second half goals from Ashley McGrath, who was swung forward at half time. A Todd Banfield goal at the 15-minute mark in the fourth term equaled the scores late in the game but a spectacular pack mark taken by Gold Coast forward Nathan Krakouer a minute later stemmed the tide as he kicked truly for his fifth goal to give the Suns a one-goal lead. McGrath's sixth goal just seconds later again equaled the scores once again. The Gold Coast were awarded a controversial free kick for a high tackle a minute later which allowed small forward Brandon Matera to play on and kick the Suns to a seven-point lead that they wouldn't relinquish. The Suns claim the inaugural QClash 18.16 (124) to 17.14 (116). Former Lion and new Sun Jared Brennan was awarded the inaugural Marcus Ashcroft Medal for his best on ground performance that included 30 disposals and 14 clearances.

QClash 11 — The bump
QClash 11 took place on 16 April 2016 at the Gabba. The Suns had compiled an undefeated 3-0 record leading into the game and were sitting equal top of the ladder while the Lions were winless sitting on the bottom of the ladder. The two teams traded goals for much of the first half as the Suns led by 2 points at the end of the first term and 8 points at half time. The biggest talking point of the night took place a minute before half time when Gold Coast defender Steven May elected to bump Brisbane ruckman Stefan Martin under his chin. Martin was knocked unconscious and was motionless for several minutes after the incident. May was a repeat offender as he had bumped Lion Tom Rockliff unconscious in QClash 9. Seemingly spurred on by what had occurred just prior to half time, the Lions gained the lead in the third quarter and eventually ran out 13-point winners at full time. The Marcus Ashcroft Medal was awarded to Irishman Pearce Hanley for his sublime 28-disposal, 2-goal performance. In the week following the match, May was referred straight to the tribunal where he later received a five-match suspension.

QClash 15 — Zorko refuses to shake hands
QClash 15 took place on 22 April 2018 at the Gabba. Both Queensland clubs had suffered embarrassing losses the week prior to the 15th local derby and were keen to prove a point in the round 5 clash. The Suns went about building a healthy lead in the first half and led the contest by 14 points at the major break. Gold Coast then led the clash by as many as 27 points in the third quarter before Brisbane began fighting back. In the midst of a goalscoring frenzy from Brisbane, North Queenslander Charlie Cameron produced one of the goals of the year with a three effort run of play that involved a gather, a handball, a recovery, a tackle break, a fend off and ultimately a spinning snap goal. By the halfway point of the fourth quarter, Gold Coast's lead had been reduced to just four points. Despite Brisbane's relentless pressure in the last eight minutes of the game, the Suns were able to hold on for a five-point victory. Touk Miller was awarded the Marcus Ashcroft Medal for his shutdown role on Brisbane vice captain Dayne Zorko. However, post-game footage captured Zorko telling his opponent to "fuck off" when approached for a handshake. Zorko was subsequently criticised by the media for the incident in the days that followed.

QClash 16 — 'Soft' comments and Zorko vs Miller
QClash 16 was held at Metricon Stadium on 18 August 2018. In the week leading up to the game, Brisbane defender Nick Robertson spoke on Macquarie Sports Radio where he labelled Gold Coast players "soft" and that he thought they "take a bit of a backwards step when blokes go hard in at the footy." Robertson added "I hope they hear that too" as the radio interview concluded. Hours later Brisbane coach Chris Fagan publicly expressed disappointment over Robertson's comments. When asked about his thoughts on Robertson's comments the next day, Gold Coast midfielder Jack Bowes was diplomatic and said "we respect all opposition." The fiery clash began with Brisbane kicking three unanswered goals before Gold Coast managed to score a goal just before quarter time. Following the quarter time siren, tempers flared as a mini-melee broke out between the two teams. The tension rose to another level midway through the second quarter when Sean Lemmens collected Brandon Starcevich with a high shot. Mitch Robinson and Lemmens collided in the immediate aftermath, while Dayne Zorko was floored metres away after being pushed into by Alex Sexton. The Lions took a slender one-goal lead into halftime as Gold Coast had fought back with five goals in the second quarter.

The Suns quickly captured ascendency early in the third quarter and held the lead until a contentious free kick was awarded to Harris Andrews, which resulted in a goal after the three-quarter time siren and subsequently handed the lead back to Brisbane. Upon viewing the replay, commentator Alastair Lynch stated "I actually don't think that is a holding free kick." Two quick goals allowed the Suns to build a nine-point lead early in the fourth quarter but a controversial 50 metre penalty for impeding the protected zone in the middle of the ground appeared to diminish the Gold Coast's momentum and resulted in a Brisbane goal from Allen Christensen. Four minutes later Dayne Beams kicked a crucial goal midway through the fourth quarter to give Brisbane a four-point lead. Despite the margin remaining at four points for the last two and a half minutes, the Lions would hold the lead and walk away victorious 10.18 (78) to 11.8 (74) in QClash 16. Dayne Beams was awarded the Marcus Ashcroft Medal for his magnificent 38-disposal performance. Gold Coast midfielder Touk Miller was given the task of tagging Brisbane captain Dayne Zorko for the entire game and camera footage consistently showed the two engaging in scuffles with one another throughout the match. In the moments following the final siren, Zorko went directly to Miller and yelled expletives to his face before smiling and extending his hand to shake Miller's. The pair shook hands before Zorko continued to follow Miller around the field with his hand extended. As was the case after QClash 15, the media criticised Zorko for demonstrating a lack of sportsmanship in the days that followed. Four fines were handed to players from either side after the match; Brisbane's Luke Hodge and Mitch Robinson as well as Gold Coast's Brayden Fiorini and Sean Lemmens received fines. A month after the clash, Touk Miller stated "we don't like each other" when asked about Zorko and the rivalry between the two clubs.

QClash 23 — Struggling Suns make a stand
Leading into the 23rd edition of the QClash, Gold Coast had lost seven consecutive matches to Brisbane by an average margin of 52 points and were publicly implored by media onlookers to make a stand in this particular clash. Intrigue began to grow in the days leading up to the match as it was confirmed that Brisbane captain Dayne Zorko would return from injury for the match and an in-form Gold Coast skipper Touk Miller was also a confirmed starter. It was also revealed that Gold Coast stalwart David Swallow would break the all-time games record for the Suns by competing in QClash 23. Both teams entered the clash in precarious ladder positions with Brisbane clinging on to a top four position on the ladder and Gold Coast within striking distance of entering the top eight. QClash 23 took place at the Gabba on 23 July 2022 and the game was hotly contested from the beginning as Brisbane led by just eight points at quarter time. The Suns stunned the vocal Brisbane home crowd in the second quarter by kicking five goals to the Lions' two majors as Gold Coast would enter the halftime break with a six point lead. The match would turn into a seesawing affair in the third quarter with six lead changes but the Suns would lead the clash by seven points at the last break with their performance being highlighted by key forwards Levi Casboult and Queenslander Mabior Chol who had combined for six goals at three quarter time. A noticeably tired Gold Coast outfit began to wilt at the midway point of the fourth quarter and conceded five consecutive goals to lose the clash by 17 points. Despite the loss, Gold Coast were highly commended for their performance against a top four side and Touk Miller was awarded a record-equalling third Marcus Ashcroft Medal as best afield. A month later, Touk Miller revealed in an interview that he had a "genuine dislike" for the Lions as well as Dayne Zorko and that it hurt him deeply to lose eight consecutive games to Brisbane.

QClash results

|- style="background:#ccf;font-size: 110%"
| 
| Season
| Date
| 
| Home Team
| 
| Away Team
| 
| Ground
| width=45 | Crowd
| Result/Winner
|
||
| Report
|- style="background:#fff;font-size: 87%;"
| 1
| rowspan="2" div style="text-align: center;" |2011
| 7 May
| 7
|style="background:#ccffcc;"| Gold Coast
|style="background:#ccffcc;"| 18.16 (124)
|  Brisbane
| 17.14 (116)
| Gabba
|bgcolor="#FFFFA6" | 25,501
|bgcolor="Red" div style="text-align: center;"|
| 8
|bgcolor="Red" div style="text-align: center;"|
| 
|- style="background:#fff;font-size: 87%;"
| 2
| 13 August 
| 21
|style="background:#ccffcc;"|  Brisbane
|style="background:#ccffcc;"| 18.15 (123)
| Gold Coast
| 8.13 (61)
|Gabba
|bgcolor="#FFFFA6" | 23,565
|bgcolor="#78184A" div style="text-align: center;"|
| 62
| style="text-align: center;"|0
| 
|- style="background:#fff;font-size: 87%;"
| 3
| rowspan="2" div style="text-align: center;" |2012
| 21 April
| 4
|style="background:#ccffcc;"|  Brisbane
|style="background:#ccffcc;"| 17.9 (111)
| Gold Coast
| 6.10 (46)
|Gabba
|bgcolor="#FFFFA6" | 21,980
|bgcolor="#78184A" div style="text-align: center;"|
| 65
|bgcolor="#78184A" div style="text-align: center;"|
| 
|- style="background:#fff;font-size: 87%;"
| 4
| 21 July
| 17
| Gold Coast
| 5.18 (48)
|style="background:#ccffcc;"|  Brisbane
|style="background:#ccffcc;"| 8.11 (59) 
| Carrara Stadium
| 16,550
|bgcolor="#78184A" div style="text-align: center;"|
| 11
|bgcolor="#78184A" div style="text-align: center;"|
| 
|- style="background:#fff;font-size: 87%;"
| 5
| rowspan="2" div style="text-align: center;" |2013
| 13 April
| 3
| Gold Coast
| 13.14 (92)
|style="background:#ccffcc;"|  Brisbane
|style="background:#ccffcc;"| 13.16 (94) 
| Carrara Stadium
| 12,961
|bgcolor="#78184A" div style="text-align: center;"|
| 2
|bgcolor="#78184A" div style="text-align: center;"|
| 
|- style="background:#fff;font-size: 87%;"
| 6
| 6 July
| 15
|style="background:#ccffcc;"|  Brisbane
|style="background:#ccffcc;"| 17.14 (116)
| Gold Coast
| 12.11 (83)
|Gabba
|bgcolor="gold"| 27,170 
|bgcolor="#78184A" div style="text-align: center;"|
| 33
|bgcolor="#78184A" div style="text-align: center;"|
| 
|- style="background:#fff;font-size: 87%;"
| 7
| rowspan="2" div style="text-align: center;" |2014
| 5 April
| 3
|style="background:#ccffcc;"| Gold Coast
|style="background:#ccffcc;"| 17.12 (114)
|  Brisbane
| 9.7 (61) 
| Carrara Stadium
| 16,593
|bgcolor="Red" div style="text-align: center;"|
| 53
|bgcolor="#78184A" div style="text-align: center;"|
| 
|- style="background:#fff;font-size: 87%;"
| 8
| 26 July
| 18
|style="background:#ccffcc;"|  Brisbane
|style="background:#ccffcc;"| 16.14 (110)
| Gold Coast
| 8.8 (56)
|Gabba
|bgcolor="#FFFFA6" | 27,167
|bgcolor="#78184A" div style="text-align: center;"|
| 54
|bgcolor="#78184A" div style="text-align: center;"|
| 
|- style="background:#fff;font-size: 87%;"
| 9
| rowspan="2" div style="text-align: center;" |2015
| 2 May
| 5
|style="background:#ccffcc;"| Gold Coast
|style="background:#ccffcc;"| 18.10 (118)
|  Brisbane
| 7.12 (54) 
| Carrara Stadium
| 12,464
|bgcolor="Red" div style="text-align: center;"|
| 64
|bgcolor="#78184A" div style="text-align: center;"|
| 
|- style="background:#fff;font-size: 87%;"
| 10
| 8 August
| 19
|  Brisbane
| 14.16 (100)
|style="background:#ccffcc;"| Gold Coast
|style="background:#ccffcc;"| 17.12 (114)
|Gabba
|bgcolor="#FFFFA6" | 20,025
|bgcolor="Red" div style="text-align: center;"|
| 14
|bgcolor="#78184A" div style="text-align: center;"|
| 
|- style="background:#fff;font-size: 87%;"
| 11
| rowspan="2" div style="text-align: center;" |2016
| 16 April
| 4
|style="background:#ccffcc;"|   Brisbane
|style="background:#ccffcc;"| 14.23 (107)
| Gold Coast
| 14.10 (94)
|Gabba
|bgcolor="#FFFFA6"|20,041
|bgcolor="#78184A" div style="text-align: center;"|
| 13
|bgcolor="#78184A" div style="text-align: center;"|
| 
|- style="background:#fff;font-size: 87%;"
| 12
| 9 July
| 16
| style="background:#ccffcc;"| Gold Coast
| style="background:#ccffcc;"| 22.7 (139)
|  Brisbane
| 17.11 (113)
| Carrara Stadium
| 13,528
|bgcolor="Red" div style="text-align: center;"|
| 26
|bgcolor="#78184A" div style="text-align: center;"|
| 
|- style="background:#fff;font-size: 87%;"
| 13
| rowspan="2" div style="text-align: center;" |2017
| 25 March
| 1
| Gold Coast
| 14.12 (96)
|style="background:#ccffcc;"|  Brisbane
|style="background:#ccffcc;"| 15.8 (98)
| Carrara Stadium
| 12,710
|bgcolor="#78184A" div style="text-align: center;"|
| 2
|bgcolor="#78184A" div style="text-align: center;"|
| 
|- style="background:#fff;font-size: 87%;"
| 14
| 12 August
| 21
|style="background:#ccffcc;"|  Brisbane
|style="background:#ccffcc;"| 22.10 (142)
| Gold Coast
| 12.12 (84)
| Gabba
| 17,772
|bgcolor="#78184A" div style="text-align: center;"|
| 58
|bgcolor="#78184A" div style="text-align: center;"|
| 
|- style="background:#fff;font-size: 87%;"
| 15
| rowspan="2" div style="text-align: center;" |2018
| 22 April
| 5
| Brisbane
| 10.11 (71)
|style="background:#ccffcc;"| Gold Coast
|style="background:#ccffcc;"| 11.10 (76)
|Gabba
| 16,087
|bgcolor="Red" div style="text-align: center;"|
| 5
|bgcolor="#78184A" div style="text-align: center;"|
| 
|- style="background:#fff;font-size: 87%;"
| 16
| 18 August
| 22
| Gold Coast
| 11.8 (74)
|style="background:#ccffcc;"| Brisbane
|style="background:#ccffcc;"| 10.18 (78) 
| Carrara Stadium
| 11,907
|bgcolor="#78184A" div style="text-align: center;"|
| 4
|bgcolor="#78184A" div style="text-align: center;"|
|  
|- style="background:#fff;font-size: 87%;"
| 17
| rowspan="2" div style="text-align: center;" |2019
| 27 April
| 6
| Gold Coast
| 9.8 (62)
|style="background:#ccffcc;"| Brisbane
|style="background:#ccffcc;"| 16.15 (111) 
| Carrara Stadium
| 13,694
|bgcolor="#78184A" div style="text-align: center;"|
| 49
|bgcolor="#78184A" div style="text-align: center;"|
|  
|- style="background:#fff;font-size: 87%;"
| 18
| 10 August 
| 21
|style="background:#ccffcc;"| Brisbane
|style="background:#ccffcc;"| 22.12 (144) 
| Gold Coast
| 8.5 (53)
| Gabba
|bgcolor="#FFFFA6"|22,530
|bgcolor="#78184A" div style="text-align: center;"|
| 91
|bgcolor="#78184A" div style="text-align: center;"|
|  
|- style="background:#fff;font-size: 87%;"
| 19
| div style="text-align: center;" |2020
| 9 September 
| 16
|style="background:#ccffcc;"| Brisbane
|style="background:#ccffcc;"| 13.10 (88) 
| Gold Coast
| 6.7 (43)
| Gabba
|11,292
|bgcolor="#78184A" div style="text-align: center;"|
| 45
|bgcolor="#78184A" div style="text-align: center;"|
|  
|- style="background:#fff;font-size: 87%;"
| 20
| rowspan="2" div style="text-align: center;" |2021
| 15 May 
| 9
| Gold Coast
| 7.9 (51)
|style="background:#ccffcc;"| Brisbane
|style="background:#ccffcc;"| 19.10 (124) 
| Carrara Stadium
|12,636
|bgcolor="#78184A" div style="text-align: center;"|
| 73
|bgcolor="#78184A" div style="text-align: center;"|
|  
|- style="background:#fff;font-size: 87%;"
| 21
| 24 July
| 20
|style="background:#ccffcc;"| Brisbane
|style="background:#ccffcc;"| 17.18 (120)
| Gold Coast
| 10.11 (71)
| Gabba
| 16,660
|bgcolor="#78184A" div style="text-align: center;"|
| 49
|bgcolor="#78184A" div style="text-align: center;"|
|  
|- style="background:#fff;font-size: 87%;"
| 22
| rowspan="2" div style="text-align: center;" |2022
| 24 April
| 6
| Gold Coast
| 11.14 (80)
|style="background:#ccffcc;"| Brisbane
|style="background:#ccffcc;"| 21.6 (132)
| Carrara Stadium
| 14,897
|bgcolor="#78184A" div style="text-align: center;"|
| 52
|bgcolor="#78184A" div style="text-align: center;"|
|  
|- style="background:#fff;font-size: 87%;"
| 23
| 23 July
| 19
|style="background:#ccffcc;"| Brisbane
|style="background:#ccffcc;"| 16.14 (110)
| Gold Coast
| 14.9 (93)
| Gabba
|bgcolor="#FFFFA6" |  21,467
|bgcolor="#78184A" div style="text-align: center;"|
| 17
|bgcolor="#78184A" div style="text-align: center;"|
|

Timeline of results

Marcus Ashcroft Medal 

The Marcus Ashcroft Medal is awarded to the player adjudged best on field during the QClash. It is named after triple Brisbane Lions AFL premiership player Marcus Ashcroft, who played junior football on the Gold Coast for Surfers Paradise and Southport. Ashcroft also held administrative roles at both the Lions and the Suns post-playing career.

Winners

Shared history

Shared players 
Below is a record of players who spent time on both lists at the Brisbane Lions and Gold Coast Suns.

Rohan Bewick (on Brisbane's list from 2011 to 2018 for 103 games) and Dayne Zorko (on Brisbane's list from 2012 to present for 230 games) were also traded from Gold Coast to Brisbane, but were only prelisted at the Suns and were never on their official list. When asked how he felt about the situation, Zorko admitted he was "extremely disappointed" and that the outcome "cut deeply" when his hometown club chose to pass on him.

Statistics
Up to date at the completion of QClash 23

Games Played

Goalkickers

Most goals in one game

Most career goals

Hitouts

Most hitouts in a game

Most career hit-outs

Disposals

Most disposals in a game

Most career disposals

Clearances

Most clearances in a game

Most career clearances

Tackles

Most tackles in a game

Most career tackles

Career Brownlow votes

 Brownlow stats not up to date.

All-time coaching record

AFL Women's
The first AFLW QClash was played on 22 February 2020 at Metricon Stadium and resulted in a draw.

AFLW Results

|- style="background:#ccf;font-size: 100%"
| 
| Season
| Date
| 
| Home Team
| 
| Away Team
| 
| Ground
| width=45 | Crowd
| Winner
||
| QClash Medal
| Report
|- style="background:#fff;font-size: 87%;"
| 1
| 2020
| 22 February
| 3
| 
| 4.4 (28)
| 
| 4.4 (28)
| Carrara Stadium
| 4,223
| div style="text-align: center;"|Draw
| div style="text-align: center;"|0
|bgcolor="#78184A" div style="text-align: center;"| 
| 
|- style="background:#fff;font-size: 87%;"
| 2
| 2021
| 7 February
| 2
| 
| 10.5 (65)
| 
| 0.2 (2)
| Hickey Park
| 2,101
|bgcolor="#78184A" div style="text-align: center;"|
|bgcolor="#78184A" div style="text-align: center;"|
|bgcolor="#78184A" div style="text-align: center;"|
| 
|- style="background:#fff;font-size: 87%;"
| 3
| 2022
| 17 February
| 7
| 
| 2.4 (16)
| 
| 12.13 (85)
| Carrara Stadium
| 1,105
|bgcolor="#78184A" div style="text-align: center;"|
|bgcolor="#78184A" div style="text-align: center;"|
|bgcolor="#78184A" div style="text-align: center;"|
| 
|- style="background:#fff;font-size: 87%;"
| 4
| S7
| 10 September
| 3
| 
| 12.10 (82)
| 
| 1.3 (9)
| The Gabba
| 2,582
|bgcolor="#78184A" div style="text-align: center;"|
|bgcolor="#78184A" div style="text-align: center;"|
|bgcolor="#78184A" div style="text-align: center;"|
|

AFLW statistics
Correct as of end of season 7.

Most AFLW career goals

Shared players 
Below is a record of players who have spent time on the lists of both clubs.

All-time coaching record

See also

 AFL Queensland (AFLQ): The governing body of Australian rules football in Queensland.
 Western Derby: The AFL Intrastate Derby of Western Australia, first played in 1995. (West Coast Eagles Vs. Fremantle Dockers).
 Showdown: The AFL Intrastate Derby of South Australia, first played in 1997. (Adelaide Crows Vs. Port Adelaide Power). 
 Sydney Derby: The AFL Intrastate Derby of New South Wales, first played in 2012. (Sydney Swans Vs. Greater Western Sydney Giants).

References

External links
 

Australian Football League games
Australian Football League rivalries
Brisbane Lions
Gold Coast Suns
Sport in Brisbane
Sport on the Gold Coast, Queensland
Australian rules football in Queensland